Amman Governorate, officially known as Muhafazat al-Asima (English translation: The Capital Governorate), is one of the governorates in Jordan. The governorate's capital is the city of Amman, which is also the country's capital. The administrative center of the governorate as well as all government offices and parliament are located in the Abdali district.

The Amman Governorate has the largest population of the 12 governorates of Jordan. It borders Zarqa Governorate to the north and north east, the governorates of Balqa and Madaba to the west, Karak and Ma'an governorates to the south. It also shares an international border with Saudi Arabia from the east.

History
The land covered by the Amman Governorate has been inhabited since the prehistoric age, ruins of civilizations as early as 7250 BC have been discovered at 'Ain Ghazal near Amman, the site itself is one of the largest prehistoric settlements in the Middle East.

Amman was the capital and stronghold of the Ammonites, which they called Rabbath Ammon, the Ammonites ruled almost the entire land of the Capital Governorate. After the Romans took control of the region, Amman was renamed as "Philadelphia", and was one of the ten Roman Decapolis cities. Following the Arab Muslim conquests, Philadelphia reclaimed the name Amman. The Byzantine site at Umm ar-Rasas was designated as a World Heritage Site in 2004.

Geography
The climate of the Amman Governorate is that of the Eastern Mediterranean climate. However, since Amman is located on a hilly plateau, the average annual precipitation and temperature generally may vary significantly from one location to another, even within the city of Amman. For instance, it may be snowing in the Sweileh district which has an elevation of 1050 m above sea level, but cloudy with no rain in the Amman city center, which has an elevation of 780 m. The Amman Governorate is the third largest governorate in Jordan by area and the largest by population.

Demographics
The Jordan national census of 2015 shows that the population of the Capital Governorate passed 4 millions, of whom more than 36% (1.45 million) were foreign nationals. This constitutes a sharp increase from the population of the 2004 census. One factor that contributed to the sharp increase in population is the high influx of refugees from neighboring countries.

The Jordan national census of 2004 indicated that the total population of the Capital Governorate at the time was 1,942,066, which grew from 1,576,238 in the 1994 census at an average annual growth of 2.1%.

The population of districts according to census results:

Administrative divisions

Nahias

Article 4 of the administrative divisions system of the Jordanian Ministry of Interior states that the Amman Governorate is divided into nine nahias, five of these nahias include the districts of Greater Amman Municipality.

Towns and villages

 

Abdoun, Abu `Alandah, Adh Dhuhaybah, Al `Al, Al `Amiriyah, Al `Arid, Al `Arudah, Al Bahhath, Al Bassah, Al Bunayyat al Janubiyah, Al Bunayyat ash Shamaliyah, Al Hawwasiyah, Al Hummar, Al Jizah, Al Jubayhah, Al Judayyidah, Al Jumayyil, Al Juwayyidah, Al Lubban, Al Mabrak, Al Mahattah, Al Manakhir, Al Mathluthah, Al Muqabalayn, Al Mushaqqar, Al Mushayrifah, Al Mushayrifah, Al Muwaqqar, Al Qartu`iyah, Al Qastal, Al Qunaytirah, Al Qurayyat, Al Quwayjiyah, Al Quwaysimah, Al Yadudah, `Ammuriya, An Naqubah, An Nuwayjis, `Ara`ir, Ar Rabahiyah, Ar Rajib, Ar Riwaq, Ash Shufatah, Ash Shumaysani, Ash Shuqayq, As Samik, As Saqrah, Ath Thughrah, `Atruz, At Tunayb, Barazin, Barzah, Barzah, Bayt Zir`ah, Biddin, Bilal, Buqay` al Qababi`ah, Dab`ah, Dhiban, Dhuhaybah, Dulaylat al Hama'idah, Dulaylat al Mutayrat, Halaq ash Shuqayq, Hawwarah, Hisban, `Iraq al Amir, Jalul, Jawa, Juraynah, Khilda, Khirbat `Assaf, Khirbat as Sahilah, Khirbat Badran, Khirbat Khaww, Khirbat Siran, Khuraybat as Suq, Kufayr Abu Sarbut, Kufayr al Wakhyan, Kufayrat Abu Khinan, Madaba, Ma`in, Manja, Marka, Mukawir, Mulayh, Murayjimat Ibn Hamid, Natl, Na`ur, Qasr al Hallabat, Qubur `Abd Allah, Qurayyat Falhah, Qurayyat Nafi`, Qurayyat Salim, Rujaym Salim, Rujm ash Shami, Rujm ash Shara'irah, Sahab, Shunat Ibn `Adwan, Sufah, Sumiya, Suwaylih, Tabarbawr, Tila` al `Ali, Umm al `Amad, Umm al Birak, Umm al Hanafish, Umm al Kundum, Umm al Qanafidh, Umm ar Rasas, Umm as Summaq, Umm Juraysat, Umm Nuwarah, Umm Qusayr, Umm Qusayr, Umm Rummanah, Umm Shujayrah al Gharbiyah, Umm Zuwaytinah, `Urjan al Gharbiyah, `Urjan ash Sharqiyah, `Uyun adh Dhi'b, Wadi as Sir, Yajuz, Zaba'ir `Udwan, Zuwayza

Education
As of 2010, there were 24 universities and community colleges in the Amman Governorate the University of Jordan is the oldest university established in the governorate, it is also Jordan's first university, other universities are the Arab Open University which is owned and run by the Arab League and Princess Sumaya University for Technology which was named after Princess Sumaya of Jordan. Petra University was ranked 20th in the Arab World by Webometrics, Philadelphia University (Jordan) is the largest private university in the Amman Governorate.

References

External links
Maplandia.com
Photos of El-Mushaggar at the American Center of Research

 
Governorates of Jordan